The 6th Central Auditing Commission of the Workers' Party of Korea (WPK)(6차 조선로동당 중앙감사위원회) was elected at the party's 6th Congress on 14 October 1980.

Upon its renewal at the 3rd WPK Conference in 2010 it was composed of one chairman, one vice chair and 13 ordinary members. In 2012, at the 4th WPK Conference, members were recalled and elected to fill vacancies but the individuals in questions were not made public.

Members

6th Congress (1980–2010)

3rd Conference (2010–16)

References

Citations

Bibliography
Books:
 
 
  

Dissertations:
 

6th Central Auditing Commission of the Workers' Party of Korea
1980 establishments in North Korea
2016 disestablishments in North Korea